Hugh McInnes VC (October 1815 – 7 December 1879) was a Scottish recipient of the Victoria Cross.

Details
McInnes was about 42 years old, and a gunner in the Bengal Artillery, Bengal Army during the Indian Mutiny when the following deeds took place at the Relief of Lucknow for which he was awarded the VC:

References

Monuments to Courage (David Harvey, 1999)
The Register of the Victoria Cross (This England, 1997)
Scotland's Forgotten Valour (Graham Ross, 1995)

External links
Location of grave and VC medal (Glasgow)
 

1815 births
1879 deaths
Military personnel from Glasgow
British recipients of the Victoria Cross
Indian Rebellion of 1857 recipients of the Victoria Cross
Bengal Artillery soldiers